Chris Kelades (born February 21, 1981), is a Canadian mixed martial artist and former interim M-1 Challenge Flyweight champion. He previously competed in the Flyweight division of the Ultimate Fighting Championship. A professional MMA competitor since 2009, Kelades made a name for himself fighting mostly in his native country. In 2014, he also fought for Bellator MMA, M-1 Global.

Mixed martial arts career

Early career
Chris Kelades began training in Brazilian jiu-jitsu which led into training wrestling and striking. He currently holds a black belt in Brazilian Jiu-Jitsu. Chris would amass a 6–0 record before signing with Bellator, but would drop a decision for the promotion at Bellator 119. He would bounce back with a win in July 2014.

Ultimate Fighting Championship
After his win at Extreme Cage Combat 21 in July, Kelades signed with the UFC.

Kelades did his promotional debut on one week short notice replacing an injured Louis Gaudinot against Paddy Holohan on October 4, 2014, at UFC Fight Night: MacDonald vs. Saffiedine. Despite being a heavy underdog, Kelades won via unanimous decision. The fight earned the Fight of the Night bonus.

Kelades faced Ray Borg on February 14, 2015, at UFC Fight Night: Henderson vs. Thatch.  Borg won the one sided fight via submission in the third round.

Kelades next faced Chris Beal on August 23, 2015, at UFC Fight Night 74. He won the fight via split decision.

Kelades faced Sergio Pettis on April 23, 2016, at UFC 197. He lost the fight by unanimous decision and was subsequently released from the promotion.

Post UFC Career

Kelades would head to Legacy Fighting Alliance to pick up a decision win against Tyler Shinn on August 4, 2017, before heading to compete in Russia for M-1 Global making his debut at M-1 Challenge 86 - Buchinger vs. Dalgiev against 	Oleg Lichkovakha, he won the fight due to submission via kimura in round 3.

On June 1, 2018, Kaledes fought Alexander Pletenko at M-1 Challenge 93 - Shlemenko vs. Silva, he would lose the fight via unanimous decision.

Kelades next faced Sergey Klyuev on September 28, 2018, in a Bantamweight contest at M-1 Challenge 97 - Bogatov vs. Pereira. He would win the fight via unanimous decision.

On August 3, 2019, Kelades rematched Alexander Pletenko for the interim M-1 Challenge Flyweight Championship at M-1 Challenge 103 - Pletenko vs. Kelades. Kelades would go on to win the fight via unanimous decision earning the M-1 Challenge Flyweight title.

Kelades would next face Asu Almabaev at M-1 Challenge 105 - Morozov vs. Rettinghouse on October 19, 2019. he would lose the bout via unanimous decision relinquishing the M-1 Challenge Flyweight title.

Mixed martial arts record

|-
|Loss
|align=center|14–5
|Asu Almabaev
|Decision (unanimous)
|M-1 Challenge 105 - Morozov vs. Rettinghouse
|
|align=center|5
|align=center|5:00
|Nur-Sultan, Kazakhstan
|
|-
|Win
|align=center|14–4
|Alexander Pletenko  
|Decision (unanimous)
|M-1 Challenge 103 - Pletenko vs. Kelades
|
|align=center|5
|align=center|5:00
|Shenzhen, China
|
|-
|Win
|align=center|13–4
|Sergey Klyuev
|Decision (unanimous)
|M-1 Challenge 97 - Bogatov vs. Pereira
|
|align=center|3
|align=center|5:00
|Kazan, Russia
|
|-
|Loss
|align=center|12–4
|Alexander Pletenko
|Decision (Unanimous)
|M-1 Challenge 93 - Shlemenko vs. Silva
|
|align=center|3
|align=center|5:00
|Chelyabinsk, Russia
|
|-
|Win
|align=center|12–3
|Oleg Lichkovakha  
|Submission (Kimura)
|M-1 Challenge 86 - Buchinger vs. Dalgiev
|
|align=center|3
|align=center|1:38
|Nazran, Russia
|
|-
|Win
|align=center|11–3
|Keegan Oliver  
|Decision (Unanimous)
|Fight Night Medicine Hat 4 
|
|align=center|3
|align=center|5:00
|Medicine Hat, Alberta, Canada
|
|-
|Win
|align=center|10–3
|Tyler Shinn
|Decision (unanimous)
|Legacy Fighting Alliance 18
|
|align=center|3
|align=center|5:00
|Shawnee, Oklahoma, United States
| 
|-
|Loss
|align=center|9–3
|Sergio Pettis
|Decision (unanimous)
|UFC 197
|
|align=center|3
|align=center|5:00
|Las Vegas, Nevada, United States
| 
|-
|Win
|align=center|9–2
|Chris Beal
|Decision (split)
|UFC Fight Night: Holloway vs. Oliveira
|
|align=center|3
|align=center|5:00
|Saskatoon, Saskatchewan, Canada
|
|-
|Loss
|align=center|8–2
|Ray Borg
|Submission (kimura)
|UFC Fight Night: Henderson vs. Thatch
|
|align=center|3
|align=center|2:56
|Broomfield, Colorado, United States
|
|-
|Win
|align=center|8–1
|Paddy Holohan
|Decision (unanimous)
|UFC Fight Night: MacDonald vs. Saffiedine
|
|align=center|3
|align=center|5:00
|Halifax, Nova Scotia, Canada
|
|-
|Win
|align=center|7–1
|Adrian Woolley
|Decision (split)
|Extreme Cage Fighting 21
|
|align=center|3
|align=center|5:00
|Halifax, Nova Scotia, Canada
|
|-
|Loss
|align=center|6–1
|Malcolm Gordon
|Decision (unanimous)
|Bellator 119
|
|align=center|3
|align=center|5:00
|Rama, Ontario, Canada
|
|-
|Win
|align=center|6–0
|Rick Doyle
|Submission (gogoplata)
|Extreme Cage Fighting 19
|
|align=center|1
|align=center|2:44
|Halifax, Nova Scotia, Canada
|
|-
|Win
|align=center|5–0
|Dimitri Waanderburg
|Decision (split)
|Instinct Fighting 1
|
|align=center|3
|align=center|5:00
|Boisbriand, Quebec, Canada
|
|-
|Win
|align=center|4–0
|Chance Whalen
|Submission (rear-naked choke)
|ECFP - Resurgence
|
|align=center|2
|align=center|3:10
|Trenton, Nova Scotia, Canada
|
|-
|Win
|align=center|3–0
|Justin Steele
|TKO (punches)
|Extreme Cage Fighting 12
|
|align=center|2
|align=center|0:36
|Halifax, Nova Scotia, Canada
|
|-
|Win
|align=center|2–0
|Vincent Cormier
|Submission (guillotine choke) 
|Friday Night Fights - Blacklash
|
|align=center|2
|align=center|4:01
|Dartmouth, Nova Scotia, Canada
|
|-
|Win
|align=center|1–0
|Jon Williams
|TKO (punches)
|Absolute Fighting Canada 3
|
|align=center|2
|align=center|3:17
|Amherst, Nova Scotia, Canada
|
|-

See also
 List of current UFC fighters
 List of male mixed martial artists
 List of Canadian UFC fighters

References

External links
 
 

1981 births
Sportspeople from Dartmouth, Nova Scotia
Sportspeople from Dallas
Flyweight mixed martial artists
Mixed martial artists utilizing wrestling
Mixed martial artists utilizing Brazilian jiu-jitsu
Living people
Canadian male mixed martial artists
Ultimate Fighting Championship male fighters
Canadian practitioners of Brazilian jiu-jitsu
People awarded a black belt in Brazilian jiu-jitsu